Hogei may refer to:
 twenty in Basque language
 Kyodo Hogei, the former name of Kyodo Senpaku, a whaling department of Japanese fisheries
 Kyokuyo Hogei Kaisha Whaling Company, one of the biggest Japanese whaling company
 Toyo Hogei K.K., a modern whaling company in Japan
 Valea Hogei, a village in Lipova, Bacău, a commune in Bacău County, Romania where Romanian mathematician Gheorghe Vrânceanu is born in 1900

Species Latin names

 Amphisbaena hogei, Vanzolini, 1950, a worm lizard species in the genus Amphisbaena
 P. hogei

 Ranacephala hogei, Mertens, 1967, a turtle species in the genus Ranacephala and the family Chelidae found in Brazil

See also
 Hoge (disambiguation)